The 2011 Swale Borough Council election took place on 5 May 2011 to elect members of Swale Borough Council in Kent, England. The whole council was up for election and the Conservative Party stayed in overall control of the council.

Background
For the 2011 election Swale switched to having the whole council elected every four years, from the previous system where a third of the seats were elected each year, followed by one year without an election. The decision was taken by the council in March 2010, after a consultation produced 162 responses in favour of the change and 136 responses against changing. As a result, all 47 seats on the council were contested with over 120 candidates standing at election.

Election result
The Conservatives remained in control of the council with 32 of the 47 seats, after a net loss of 1 seat. Labour increased to 13 councillors, the Liberal Democrats were reduced to 1 seat and the only independent councillor retained her seat.

Labour's Mark Ellen regained a seat in Sheerness East that he had lost at the 2010 election, while in Milton Regis Labour defeated the leader of the Liberal Democrat group Elvie Lowe who had represented the ward for 24 years. However the Conservatives took a seat from Labour in St Michaels ward, where the Conservative deputy mayoress Sylvia Bennett gained a seat on the council.

In West Downs the only independent councillor, Monique Bonney, held her seat defeating Conservative county councillor Mike Whiting by 41 votes. Meanwhile, the closest result came in Murston where both the Conservative and Liberal Democrat councillors, Ed Gent and Dave Banks, took 420 votes after six recounts. Conservative Ed Gent took the seat after his name was pulled out of a hat and he was therefore given one extra vote. This meant Mike Henderson was the only Liberal Democrat to be elected after he held his seat in Davington Priory.

Following the election Roger Truelove became the new leader of the Labour group, replacing the leader for the previous 15 years Angela Harrison. The only Liberal Democrat councillor, Mike Henderson, meanwhile joined with the independent councillor Monique Bonney in the independent group on the council to ensure they both got positions on council committees.

Ward results

By-elections between 2011 and 2015

Kemsley
A by-election was held in Kemsley on 8 March 2012 after the death of Conservative councillor Brenda Simpson. The seat was held for the Conservatives by Mike Whiting with a majority of 72 votes over Labour candidate Richard Raycraft.

Sheppey Central
A by-election was held in Sheppey Central on 16 October 2014 following the death of Conservative councillor John Morris. The seat was gained for the UK Independence Party by David Jones with a majority of 507 votes over Conservative Tina Booth. David Jones became the second UK Independence Party councillor on Swale council after the defection of Adrian Crowther from the Conservatives in 2013.

References

2011
2011 English local elections
2010s in Kent